Hot Dreams is the fifth studio album by Canadian band Timber Timbre, released on March 31, 2014 on Arts & Crafts. The album was a shortlisted nominee for the 2014 Polaris Music Prize.

Production
Frontman Taylor Kirk left Ontario for Los Angeles to write the album and was inspired by his surroundings in the Laurel Canyon. Not writing alone anymore – as they had on previous albums – the group focused more on a rock and roll trajectory with the new album, also making heavy use of vintage synthesizers and the mellotron. The album was produced by Kirk and Simon Trottier. It was engineered by Graham Lessard at Banff Centre in Banff, Alberta and at Hotel2Tango in Montreal. Additional recordings were done by Trottier at the National Music Centre in Calgary and in Hull, Quebec with Olivier Fairfield.

Critical reception

Hot Dreams was released to mostly positive reviews. At Metacritic, which assigns a normalized rating out of 100 to reviews from mainstream critics, the album received an average score of 80, based on 19 reviews, which indicates a "generally favorable" reception.

Heather Phares of AllMusic wrote, "While Hot Dreams is slightly less immediate than Creep on Creepin' On, its potent cocktail of menace, glamour, and vulnerability is nothing less than transporting." Kerry Doole of Exclaim! wrote, "[Kirk] proves himself a master of melancholy, as on the Tindersticks-like "This Low Commotion" and the gentle "Run from Me," but he and his comrades inject enough dynamic range to hold your attention throughout."

Track listing

Notes
 "Curtains?!" features words by Simone Schmidt
 "Bring Me Simple Men" features words by Simone Schmidt

Personnel

Musicians
 Taylor Kirk – vocals (1–4, 6–9), drums (1–8, 10), acoustic guitar (1, 2, 6, 9), Novachord (1, 3), piano (2, 6–8, 10), percussion (2–9), electric guitar (2, 3, 6–9), Farfisa organ (3), theremin (6), Mellotron (7), Hammond organ (8)
 Simon Trottier – baritone guitar (all tracks), EBow guitar (1), concert bass drum (1), tubular bells (1, 4, 6, 8, 9), electric guitar (2, 3, 4, 5, 9, 10), vocals (3, 8), acoustic guitar (4), Marxophone (4, 6, 9), lap steel guitar (5, 7), Mellotron (5), EBow lap steel guitar (6, 10), chains (6, 9), percussion (10)
 Mika Posen – strings (1, 2, 4–10), vocals (9, 10)
 Mathieu Charbonneau – Mellotron (1, 10), Vox Continental (1), Chamberlin M1 (2, 6), Novachord (3, 5, 8), harpsichord (4, 5, 7, 10), piano (4, 9), Farfisa organ (7), Wurlitzer electronic piano (8)
 Olivier Fairfield – tape machine (1, 10), synthesizer (1, 6, 10), Fender Rhodes piano (2, 5), drums (5, 9), Hohner Pianet (5), electric guitar (5), Hammond organ (9)
 Mark Lawson – drum synthesizer
 Colin Stetson – C melody saxophone (2, 6, 10), tenor saxophone (2), bass saxophone (2, 5, 6, 8, 10), baritone saxophone (5, 8)
 Romy Lightman – vocals (2, 9)

Technical
 Taylor Kirk – production
 Simon Trottier – production, additional recording
 Graham Lessard – engineering
 Ben Oegema – assistant engineering
 Mark Lawson – mixing
 Harris Newman – mastering

Packaging
 Robyn Kotyk – layout
 Taylor Kirk – layout, cover photograph
 Laura Margaret Ramsey – insert photograph

References

2014 albums
Timber Timbre albums
Arts & Crafts Productions albums